Gabe Loeffelholz (born November 11, 1940) is an American Republican politician from Wisconsin

Born in the town of Paris, Grant County, Wisconsin, Loeffelholz served in the Wisconsin National Guard. He served in the Wisconsin State Assembly from 2001 until 2007, when he was defeated by Phil Garthwaite for reelection in 2006.

References

People from Grant County, Wisconsin
Military personnel from Wisconsin
1940 births
Living people
21st-century American politicians
Republican Party members of the Wisconsin State Assembly